The Nyaneka dwarf gecko (Lygodactylus nyaneka) is a species of gecko endemic to Angola.

References

Lygodactylus
Reptiles described in 2020
Endemic fauna of Angola